Julens hjältar ("The Heroes of Christmas") was the Sveriges Television's Christmas calendar in 1999.

Plot 
By mistake, a box with Christmas tree decorations have ended up at the wrong place during the Christmas preparations.

Video 
The series was released to VHS and DVD on 19 November 2001.

References

External links 
 
 

1999 Swedish television series debuts
1999 Swedish television series endings
Sveriges Television's Christmas calendar